Kseniya Milova (born 6 January 1992) is a Russian handball player for Dinamo Volgograd and the Russian national team.

References

1992 births
Living people
Russian female handball players
Handball players at the 2010 Summer Youth Olympics